St. Joseph's College Higher Secondary School is a private Catholic primary and secondary school for boys located in Tiruchirappalli, Trichy, Tamil Nadu, India. The school was founded by the Jesuits in 1844 who continue to run the school.

History
St. Joseph Boys Higher Secondary School is located on the campus of St. Joseph's College, Tiruchirappalli. The school is Tamil-medium through the sixth grade and then becomes both Tamil and English-medium, through the twelfth grade.

See also
 List of Jesuit schools

References  

Jesuit secondary schools in India
Jesuit primary schools in India
Boys' schools in India
Christian schools in Tamil Nadu
Primary schools in Tamil Nadu
High schools and secondary schools in Tamil Nadu
Schools in Tiruchirappalli
Tamil-language schools
Educational institutions established in 1844
1844 establishments in India